The 2009 CAF Beach Soccer Championship was a qualifying tournament held during 1 July – 5 July, 2009 in Durban, South Africa that determined which two participants will represent the CAF region at the 2009 FIFA Beach Soccer World Cup.

Participating teams

Format
The nine nation tournament consisted of three groups. The teams played each other once in their group during the group stage. The top teams in each group advanced to the semifinals, the fourth team would be selected according to the best of the second top team of the three groups. The semifinal winners qualified for the 2009 FIFA Beach Soccer World Cup.

Group stage

Group A

Group B

Group C

Knockout stage

Winners

Qualified Teams

Final standing

References
https://www.rsssf.org/tablesf/fifabeach09.html

CAF Championship
FIFA Beach Soccer World Cup qualification (CAF)
2009 in beach soccer